Brunel Fucien (born 26 August 1984) is a Haitian footballer currently playing for AS Capoise of the Ligue Haïtienne.

He previously played for Haitian club Aigle Noir AC, for Chilean club Cobreloa, and for Aiglon du Lamentin of Martinique.

External links
 
 
 

1984 births
Living people
Sportspeople from Port-au-Prince
Haitian footballers
Haitian expatriate footballers
Haiti international footballers
Aigle Noir AC players
AS Capoise players
Cobreloa footballers
Aiglon du Lamentin players
Ligue Haïtienne players
Chilean Primera División players
Expatriate footballers in Chile
Expatriate footballers in Martinique
Haitian expatriate sportspeople in Chile
Haitian expatriate sportspeople in Martinique
Association football forwards